The View Point Inn, located in Corbett, Oregon, is listed on the National Register of Historic Places. 

In 2008, the inn was used in filming of prom scenes in the first film of the Twilight Saga film series.  The exposure generated by the film was credited with giving the hotel and its restaurant a boost in business.

In July 2011, the building's second floor was gutted by a fire, and its owners, Geoff Thompson and Angelo Simione, faced financial difficulties, as the insurance on the building had lapsed. In October 2013, plans were made to rebuild and reopen the historic structure, with work slated to begin the winter of 2013–2014. Restore Oregon listed the inn on its 2012 list of Endangered Places; in December 2014 it reported that restoration was unlikely.

See also
 List of Oregon's Most Endangered Places
 National Register of Historic Places listings in Multnomah County, Oregon

References

External links
 

1924 establishments in Oregon
Carl L. Linde buildings
Columbia River Gorge
Historic Columbia River Highway
Hotel buildings completed in 1924
Hotel buildings on the National Register of Historic Places in Oregon
National Register of Historic Places in Multnomah County, Oregon
Oregon's Most Endangered Places